The Vox AC30 is a guitar amplifier manufactured by Vox. It was introduced in 1958 to meet the growing demand for louder amplifiers. Characterised by its "jangly" high-end sound it has become widely recognized by British musicians and others, such as George Harrison and John Lennon of the Beatles, Bill Wyman of the Rolling Stones, Brian May of Queen, Dave Davies of the Kinks and Hank Marvin.

History
The Vox AC30 was originally introduced in 1959 at Hank Marvin's request as the "big brother" of the fifteen watt (15 W) AC15 model, Vox's original flagship amplifier, because the AC15 was not loud enough with the screaming fans at Cliff Richard's concerts. The AC15 was powered by a pair of EL84 tubes, an EF86-driven "Normal" channel, an ECC83-driven "Vib-Trem" channel, and rectified by an EZ81. The original first-generation AC30 used a GZ34 tube rectifier, three ECC83s (12AX7) for the Normal channel and the tremolo/vibrato oscillator/modulator circuits, one ECC81 (12AT7) phase inverter, and EL84 tubes in the power amplifier circuit.

This first generation of AC30s were housed in "TV-front" cabinets, much like the early to mid-50s tweed Fender amps, and had a single 12-inch Goodmans 60-watt speaker, as opposed to the later, conventional twin 12-inch speaker configuration. These early amps sported a thin white covering ("Rexine") with a small printed diamond pattern and larger diamond pattern grill cloth. However, the EL34-powered AC30 was short lived, and a new AC30 version appeared in late 1959. This second generation AC30/4 had two channels with two inputs, hence the "4" in the model name, and a single tone control, and was powered by a quartet of EL84 (6BQ5) power tubes, making it truly a doubling of the AC15 power amp circuit. The AC30/4 also carried over the AC15's preamplifier circuit, which included the EF86 pentode in its "Normal" channel. Vox initially offered a 1×12" version but subsequently introduced the 2×12" AC30 Twin, which solved the volume problem at larger venues. The first AC30 Twins used two Goodmans Audiom 60 15-Watt Speakers, followed by Celestion G12 alnico speakers.

By 1960, Vox had forsaken the more conservative TV-front look for the now legendary cabinet design that has remained largely unchanged since 1960. The new cabinets featured a different covering known as fawn Rexine, which was a sort of beige leathercloth with a subtle printed grain. The front baffle was now divided by a thin gold-toned strip with the upper valence covered in fawn Rexine, and the lower grille covered in brown diamond cloth. Ventilation was provided by three small brass vents on the top of the cabinet, and the TV-front's single suitcase type handle was replaced with three leather straps.

Since the higher output AC30/4 shared its preamplifier design with the lower powered AC15, Vox discovered the high-gain EF86 tube was susceptible to microphonics, or even failure, when exposed to the increased vibration present in this uprated amp. Vox soon tired of the problem so to cure AC30/4 reliability issues caused by the troublesome EF86 preamp tube, in late 1960 Vox redesigned the preamp circuit, replaced the EF86 with an ECC83 (12AX7), and released this new design as the AC30/6. The AC30/6 was now an amp with three channels, each channel having two inputs. 

About this time, the "Top Boost" (or "Brilliance") feature became available as Vox's optional addition of a rear panel-mounted circuit that introduced an extra gain stage and tone controls for bass and treble (as opposed to the single "tone" control of earlier AC30s). The unit became so popular that its features were soon incorporated in newer AC30/6 models, and the controls moved from the rear panel to the control panel. Vox AC30/6 amplifiers from around 1963 had already implemented the top boost, and therefore had three tone controls. People began to refer to these amplifiers as AC30TBs. Later on, Vox also offered additional versions of the AC30 unit. In addition to the "Normal" version without the Top Boost, and the Top Boost version (which was a Normal version with the "Brilliance" unit added), Vox, with slight circuit modifications, created two more versions that were "voiced" in Brilliant (Treble), and Bass styles. Over the years many different AC30 models appeared but many consider the AC30 "Super Twin" to be the ultimate AC30, with a "trapezoid" shaped head and a separate speaker mounted on a trolley (see The Vox Story, Petersen & Denney 1993, p.39; see also the Vox showroom web site).

To meet the demand of providing louder sound levels in live settings, the Vox AC50 was introduced as louder yet similar sounding "Super Twin" model, providing over 50 watts of power. And the infamous AC100 was produced shortly after which was the loudest of the Vox AC models ranging in 80-100 watts.

In the late '60s Jennings drifted into financial problems and the company experienced various owner changes. Quality control was also inconsistent.

During the Vox brand's early '70s "Dallas Arbiter" period, the tube rectifiers of AC30s were replaced by silicon rectifiers, which became standard on later AC30TB models. In the late 1970s Vox also introduced a solid-state AC30 (AC30SS), which is the AC30 model that was used by Status Quo. A tube AC30TB with spring reverb feature was reintroduced in 1978.

In spite of at least one AC30 production run titled "Limited Edition" of 100 units with starting serial number 0100 (1991) (no reverb), production of the AC30 has practically never ceased: Newer AC30s are reissues of the various top boost AC30/6 (AC30TB) models. AC30s made between 1989 and 1993 also had spring reverb as a standard feature.

The Rose Morris company, who owned the Vox name through the 1980s, sold Vox to Korg in the early 1990s, who then manufactured a reissue of the early '60s AC30 Top Boost, correcting previous inconsistencies ranging from the correct style grille cloth to the GZ34 rectifier tube. These AC30 amps were mostly offered in the traditional black Tolex/brown diamond grille configuration, but were also available in limited numbers with purple, red, or tan tolex. These amplifiers, like all AC30s to this point, were manufactured in Great Britain. These were available with a choice of Celestion "Blue" or "Greenback" speakers. In the mid 1980s, a company in Marlborough, MA, called Primo, imported and began re-distributing the AC30s in the U.S.

AC30HW Limited (2003)
In 2003, Vox created the "AC30 Heritage Handwired Limited Edition" amplifier (AC30HW). This amplifier differed from the standard offering in notable ways. First, the circuitry was constructed using old-fashioned tag strips. According to Vox this was far more labor-intensive, but it allowed for easier repair versus circuit boards because there were no copper tracks to burn. According to the Vox showroom site:

"1960s era Vox amps were hand wired on tag strips. The connecting lead (or wire) from each electronic part was manually wrapped around a terminal, or "tag," and then soldered. This mode of amp construction is very labour-intensive and the workmanship and accuracy of the employee building the amp will affect the performance of the product. It was for this reason that most electronics manufacturers transitioned to phenolic printed circuit boards by 1970."

The second notable difference was the features and control layout. Guitar Player magazine reviewed the amp in its "Exotica" feature, December 2002. The article specifies details of the amp, including price, and its control layout:

"The AC30 HW ($4,000; head $3,250; 2×12 cab $1,350), which was developed with input from boutique amp designer Tony Bruno, features the famous Top Boost preamp, but has a control that is quite different from the standard model. For starters, there are only two inputs, which are marked Hi and Lo (AC30s traditionally have six inputs). To the right are the volume, treble, bass and tone-cut controls, a tremolo section with speed and depth knobs, a reverb section with reverb and tone controls, and a master volume." [And further into the article:] Top of the Marque. The AC30HW is by far the best AC variant to date. Few amps come close to matching its radiant complexity and those that do typically don't offer reverb and tremolo. The only downer about the HW is that only 350 of them will be made (along with 200 heads and cabinets)."

AC30 Custom Classic Series
In 2004, Vox introduced a new series of amplifier called the AC30 Custom Classic. It claims to combine attributes of the original AC30 with what Vox sales literature refers to as a "boutique" of features. Specifications of the AC30CC series are two Inputs (Top Boost and Normal), an Input Link Switch for blending channels, a Normal Volume knob, a Brilliance Switch, a Top Boost Volume knob, a Treble knob, an EQ Standard/Custom Switch, Bass and Reverb Controls (Tone, Mix, and a Dwell Switch), Tremolo Speed & Depth knobs, a Tone Cut knob, a Master Volume knob, a Standby and a Power Switch, switchable cathode bias (Output Bias switch: "50 Hot": 33W at full power, "82 Warm": 22W at low power), switchable filter values (vintage/modern), and a true bypass effects loop. Newer AC30CC (or "Custom Classic") reissues (CC1, CC2X CCH head) are produced in China.

AC30 Custom Series
At the 2010 Winter NAMM expo Vox introduced the Custom series; these models were updates to the 2004 Custom Classic series amplifiers and featured two channels (Normal and Top Boost) with two inputs for each channel (High and Low), more akin to the original AC30/4 layout released in 1958. It was available with either Greenback speakers (C2) or Alnico Blue Speakers (C2x), and was also available as the AC15. Later limited edition models include the AC30BL, a tygoon blue tolex with grey speaker cloth, an AC30C2RD with a red finish, an AC30C2-BRG a British Racing Green tolex finish with a grey speaker cloth and the AC30C2 Black Comet; featuring a patterned finish all are identical to the C2. The amp featured an option known as "Jumping" where the High-Normal channel could be linked to the Low-Top Boost channel with a patch lead, whilst the guitar is plugged into the High-Top Boost channel, allowing both channels to sound and create a fuller, thicker overdrive sound. The amp also featured a solid-state rectifier to increase reliability. Controls include a Normal volume, Top Boost Volume, Treble and Bass controls, Reverb Tone and Level controls, Tremolo Speed and Depth controls, a Tone Cut control (to add further control over the higher-frequencies), a Master Volume, and a Standby and Power Switch. A true bypass effects loop, extension cab output and external cab output were also included; as well as an input for the external foot switch (to control Reverb and Tremolo). The amps are produced in China. The amps were released to critical success, garnering awards such as Music Radar's "Guitarist Choice" award.

AC30 Handwired (2007)
Introduced in 2010, the amp featured Hand-wired turret board construction (against cheaper PCB construction), Birch-ply cabinets featuring solid bracing and a natural high frequency diffuser (versus MDF cabinets and no high frequency diffuser); All-tube design (different from the Custom series tube pre/power amp but solid-state rectifier); ECC83/12AX7 preamp tubes (×3) EL84 power tube quartet; (AC30 models); EL84 Duet (AC15 models); GZ34 rectifier (AC30 models); EZ81 rectifier (AC15 models); came factory-fitted with matched Ruby Tubes to provide extended dynamic range; maintained the traditional VOX two-channel design (Top Boost and Normal. High and Low inputs for each channel); the Normal channel features an additional BRIGHT switch; The top boost channel features a HOT/COOL switch to achieve even more gain. A Master Volume/BYPASS switch completely bypasses the Master Volume section allowing incredible levels of gain and sustain to be achieved. OP mode switch cut the amp's Output Power level in half (30 > 15 on the AC30, 15 > 7.5 on the AC15) allowing higher levels of saturation to be achieved at lower volumes. A Vintage fawn-colored vinyl covering, reminiscent of the 1960 classic AC30 and was available with either Celestion Alnico Blue or Celestion G12M Greenback speakers. A VFS1 footswitch controls the Top Boost channel's HOT/COOL switch was also included. The Heritage series 50th anniversary models incorporate the classic EF86 pre-amp tube, which although subject to failure in the late '50s had been re-introduced and improved. The classic EF86 pre-amp tube is remarkable for its high gain and for the notable harmonic overtones it produces and feeds to the power tubes when driven into distortion, providing the creamy distinctive VOX sound of the early hand made amplifiers produced by Jennings of Dartford. Clapton, Cream, Pink Floyd and Queen are ambassadors to the success of the early AC30s. The Heritage series 50th anniversary model stands alone as either the AC15 or AC30 with this distinct circuitry not found in the current VOX line-up.

AC30BM
In 2006, Vox released a limited edition version of the amp, the AC30BM, based on the tone of one of the amp's most prominent and consistent endorsers, Brian May of Queen. The amp is limited to only 500 examples worldwide, in a 'never-to-be-repeated' run. As the amp is designed to replicate May's tone, there are no controls on the amp except for a single volume control, though a switch enables the user to halve the number of output valves (therefore reducing the output to 15 watts as well as the volume, making it more suitable for home use), and there is a boost function operated from the included footswitch.

JMI returns
As of 2006, a company having licensed the name JMI (Jennings Musical Instruments) began manufacturing period correct, British made AC30 "copy" amplifiers, available in both black and beige. Since this incarnation of JMI has never owned the Vox brand, their official website lists the disclaimer "JMI amplification are in no way affiliated with Vox amplification (Korg)", and the models are listed as 30/6 (6 input) and 30/4 (4 inputs, sans "Brilliant" channel). As originally the case in the 1960s, Top Boost is offered as a retrofit upgrade and is not standard, and the original configuration 4/6 inputs are offered with options for Green/Blue speakers, the blue speakers being similar in appearance to the Celestion alnico speaker but made by Fane International with fiberglass voice coils, which allow them a much higher 100 watt power rating. JMI later changed alnico speakers to ones made by Tayden.

AC30VR
Another recent addition is the VOX AC30VR (Valve Reactor). According to the Vox website, this version of the AC30 includes both "solid-state" and "tube" technology. Originally designed for the Valvetronix modelling amplifiers, the Valve Reactor circuit places a 12AX7 dual triode vacuum tube (or "valve") into the power stage, which is a tube configured to act as a small power amplifier. Too small to be used as an amplifier on its own, the output of this Valve Reactor circuit is fed to a solid state power amp that boosts the output signal.

Electronics
Though widely believed to be a class A amplifier, the AC30 is in fact class AB.  It uses a quartet of cathode-biased EL-84 output tubes in push-pull configuration.  The high bias condition is believed by some to be the source of the amplifier's famous immediate response and "jangly" high-end, though the lack of negative feedback, minimal preamp circuit, simple low loss tone stack, and the use of cathode biasing on the output stage play at least as large a role, if not larger.  The Celestion "Blue" speakers that are integral to the AC30 also contribute much to the sound of the unit.  The two 12" 15-watt speakers, often overdriven and at the brink of their power handling capability, provide a cutting mid-range speaker sound that is immediate and sharp and a distinction from the Marshall or Fender-style amplifier.

References

External links
 Vox's page on the AC30CC
 JMI's official page

Valve amplifiers
Instrument amplifiers